Carbonite may refer to: 

 Carbonite (explosive), one of the earliest and most successful coal-mining explosives
 Carbonite (ion), the inorganic anion that form conjugate base of dihydroxymethylidene with the chemical formula [CO2]2−
 Carbonite (online backup), an online backup service
 Carbonite (Star Wars), a fictional substance, most notably used to imprison Han Solo in the film The Empire Strikes Back
 Carbonite-2, an imagery technology demonstrator satellite